Cheonho station is a subway station on the Seoul Subway Line 5 and Line 8. Its station subname is Pungnaptoseong, referring to the Pungnaptoseong that runs between this station and the southeastern end of the Olympic Bridge.

Station layout

Line 5

Line 8

References 

Railway stations opened in 1995
Seoul Metropolitan Subway stations
Metro stations in Gangdong District